Chen Jieyi may refer to:

 Kit Chan
 Alvin Tan (blogger)